This article provides the list of episodes from the television series Wildlife on One.

Wildlife on One ran on BBC One from 1977 to 2005 for 33 series with a total of 253 episodes. Repeats were screened on BBC Two under the name Wildlife on Two.

Series overview

Series 1 (1977)
Series 2 (1977)

Series 3 (1978)

Series 4 (1979)

Series 5 (1980)

Series 6 (1980)

Series 7 (1981)

Series 8 (1981)

Series 9 (1982)

Series 10 (1982)

Series 11 (1983)

Series 12 (1983)

Series 13 (1985) 

Series 14 (1985)

Series 15 (1987)

Series 16 (1988)

Series 17 (1989)

Series 18 (1991)

Series 19 (1992)

Series 20 (1993)

Series 21 (1994)

Series 22 (1995)

Series 23 (1996)

Series 24 (1997)

Series 25 (1997)

Series 26 (1998)

Series 27 (1999)

Series 28 (1999)

Series 29 (2000)

Series 30 (2001)

Series 31 (2002)

Series 32 (2003)

Series 33 (2004–05)

Lists of British non-fiction television series episodes
Lists of documentary television series episodes